A League of Their Own is an American television sitcom that aired on CBS from April 10 to 24, 1993, with two additional episodes aired on August 13, 1993; one episode out of the six produced went unaired. It was based on the 1992 movie of the same name and starred Sam McMurray. Only Megan Cavanagh, Tracy Reiner, Garry Marshall, and Freddie Simpson reprised their roles from the movie.

Premise
Jimmy Dugan is the coach of a team of female baseball players during World War II.

Cast
Sam McMurray as Coach Jimmy Dugan
Carey Lowell as Dottie Hinson
Christine Elise as Kit Keller
Tracy Nelson as Evelyn Gardner
Megan Cavanagh as Marla Hooch
Tracy Reiner as Betty Horn
Wendy Makkena as Mae Mordabito
Katie Rich as Doris Murphy

Episodes

Home Media
On June 16, 2020, the episodes “Dottie’s Back”, “Marathon”, and the unaired episode “Shortstop” were released as bonuses on the 4K Ultra HD Blu-ray release of the 1992 film; as part of the Columbia Classics 4K Ultra HD Blu-ray Collection Volume 1.

Reboot

On August 6, 2020, Amazon Prime Video gave a series order to reboot the television series.

References

External links

1990s American sitcoms
1993 American television series debuts
1993 American television series endings
American sports television series
Baseball television series
English-language television shows
CBS original programming
Live action television shows based on films
Television series by Sony Pictures Television
Television series set in the 1940s
Television shows set in Chicago